The National Warplane Museum is a warbird and military history museum currently located on the grounds of the Geneseo Airport in Geneseo, New York. Founded in 1994, the museum restores, flies, and displays vintage military aircraft from the Second World War and Korean War eras.  In 1998, after a split developed in the membership with two thirds of the group wanting to move to a modern airport and grow, the National Warplane Museum moved to the Elmira-Corning Regional Airport near Horseheads, New York.  In 2010, the Horseheads museum reinvented itself as the Wings of Eagles Discovery Center.  In 2013, the National Warplane Museum name was reacquired by the 1941 Historical Aircraft Group which remained in Geneseo.   The museum hosts the annual Geneseo Airshow, billed as the "Greatest Show On Turf."

Aircraft collection 
 Douglas C-47 "W7" - Restored and airworthy
 Beechcraft C-45 - Restored and airworthy
 Douglas B-23 Dragon - Stored, awaiting restoration
 Fairchild C-119 Flying Boxcar - Undergoing restoration
 Fokker DVII - (Replica) airworthy
 Antonov An-2 "Natasha" - Undergoing maintenance, on display
 Lockheed T-33 Shooting Star - On display
 North American AT-6 - Undergoing restoration
 Grumman F6F Hellcat (Replica) - On display
 Beechcraft UC-43 Staggerwing - Airworthy
 Aeronca L-16 - Airworthy
 Piper L-21 (Replica) - Airworthy
 YO-55 Ercoupe - Airworthy
 Ryan Navion - Airworthy
 Aero Commander 100 - Airworthy
 Lockheed C-130 Hercules "Saigon Lady" - Undergoing restoration

Hosted aircraft 
The museum also hosts several aircraft owned by the Military Aircraft Restoration Corporation.

Land-Based Equipment Collection 
The museum houses a small group named "The 1941 Motor Pool Restoration Shop." This group acquires, restores, and maintains a variety of land-based military vehicles. Currently working out of a pole barn next to the museum's main hangar, The 1941 Motor Pool Restoration Shop is not a separate business entity, and instead serves as a way to internally categorize museum projects.
 DUKW - Restoration nearly complete - All major systems are functional
 Oshkosh MB-5 - Undergoing restoration - Drive systems, lights and PKP firefighting systems are functional
 GMC CCKW 2½-ton 6×6 truck - Restoration pending - Major components missing
 GE 60 inch carbon arc Searchlight - Light restoration complete - Power supply awaiting restoration

See also
List of aerospace museums

References

External links 

 National Warplane Museum - official site

Aerospace museums in New York (state)
Military and war museums in New York (state)
Museums in Livingston County, New York